Prince Emmanuel Doudu Besea, known as Emmanuel Besea (born 15 April 1997) is a Ghanaian footballer who plays as a midfielder.

Club career
He made his professional debut in the Serie B for Modena on 17 October 2015 in a game against Ascoli.

On 2 September 2019, he joined Viterbese on loan.

On 5 October 2020 his contract with Frosinone was terminated by mutual consent.

On 27 July 2021, he signed with Vis Pesaro for a term of one year with an option to extend for another year.

References

External links
 
 

1997 births
Living people
People from Bono Region
Ghanaian footballers
Association football midfielders
Serie B players
Serie C players
Modena F.C. players
Frosinone Calcio players
Venezia F.C. players
U.S. Viterbese 1908 players
Vis Pesaro dal 1898 players
Ghanaian expatriate footballers
Ghanaian expatriate sportspeople in Italy
Expatriate footballers in Italy